Melissa Bime is a nursing graduate and the co-founder of Infiuss Health. Infiuss is an online blood bank that collects and brings blood donations to and from hospitals. She started Infiuss in December 2017. Since then, more than 2,300 bags of blood have been brought to patients at 23 hospitals in Yaoundé and Douala from Infiuss motorbikes.  Infiuss was a winner of USAID's Inclusive Health Access Prize. She also won $25,000 at the Anzisha Prize awards.

Access to blood before Infiuss was a problem for both doctors and patients in Yaoundé.  A child in a hospital where Melissa had worked died from anemia caused from malaria. They could not find the right blood to prevent this. Melissa decided to find a solution to the blood transfusion problem in Cameroon.

In 2019, Bime had asked for a permit from the ministry of health so that Infiuss could operate in public hospitals but it was declined, even though they had many meetings, and some with the prime minister.

Bime was raised in the city of Bamenda.

References 

Living people
Cameroonian businesspeople
People from Bamenda
Cameroonian nurses
Year of birth missing (living people)